Sorokinsky District  is an administrative district (raion), one of the twenty-two in Tyumen Oblast, Russia. As a municipal division, it is incorporated as Sorokinsky Municipal District. It is located in the east of the oblast. Its administrative center is the rural locality (a selo) of Bolshoye Sorokino. Population: 10,254 (2010 Census);  The population of Bolshoye Sorokino accounts for 51.9% of the district's total population.

References

Notes

Sources

Districts of Tyumen Oblast